Alan Charles Terry (born September 27, 1950) is an American retired professional basketball player. Terry was drafted by the Milwaukee Bucks in the second round of the 1972 NBA draft. He played small forward with the team for two seasons. Following his time with the Bucks, Terry was a member of the San Antonio Spurs of the American Basketball Association (ABA) until 1975. After playing another season in the ABA with the New York Nets, Terry re-joined the NBA when the Nets joined the league in 1976.

Career statistics

NBA

Regular season

|-
| align="left" | 1972–73
| align="left" | Milwaukee
| 67 || - || 10.3 || .340 || - || .708 || 2.2 || 0.6 || - || - || 1.9
|-
| align="left" | 1973–74
| align="left" | Milwaukee
| 7 || - || 4.6 || .333 || - || .000 || 0.4 || 0.6 || 0.3 || 0.0 || 1.1
|-
| align="left" | 1976–77
| align="left" | New York
| 61 || - || 17.6 || .403 || - || .774 || 2.3 || 0.6 || 1.0 || 0.2 || 5.0
|- class="sortbottom"
| style="text-align:center;" colspan="2"| Career
| 135 || - || 13.3 || .380 || - || .756 || 2.2 || 0.6 || 0.9 || 0.1 || 3.3
|}

Playoffs

|-
| align="left" | 1972–73
| align="left" | Milwaukee
| 5 || - || 3.6 || .800 || - || .000 || 0.6 || 0.2 || - || - || 1.6
|- class="sortbottom"
| style="text-align:center;" colspan="2"| Career
| 5 || - || 3.6 || .800 || - || .000 || 0.6 || 0.2 || - || - || 1.6
|}

ABA

Regular season

|-
| align="left" | 1973–74
| align="left" | San Antonio
| 61 || - || 17.9 || .449 || .500 || .878 || 2.7 || 1.2 || 0.3 || 0.1 || 4.9
|-
| align="left" | 1974–75
| align="left" | San Antonio
| 79 || - || 15.0 || .473 || .375 || .736 || 2.7 || 0.9 || 0.5 || 0.0 || 4.3
|-
| style="text-align:left;background:#afe6ba;" | 1975–76†
| align="left" | New York
| 66 || - || 14.7 || .390 || .286 || .759 || 2.2 || 0.6 || 0.5 || 0.1 || 3.3
|- class="sortbottom"
| style="text-align:center;" colspan="2"| Career
| 206 || - || 15.8 || .441 || .323 || .789 || 2.6 || 0.9 || 0.4 || 0.1 || 4.2
|}

Playoffs

|-
| align="left" | 1973–74
| align="left" | San Antonio
| 7 || - || 16.0 || .458 || .000 || .667 || 3.4 || 1.0 || 0.0 || 0.0 || 3.7
|-
| align="left" | 1974–75
| align="left" | San Antonio
| 5 || - || 24.6 || .480 || .000 || .750 || 3.8 || 0.4 || 0.6 || 0.2 || 5.4
|-
| style="text-align:left;background:#afe6ba;" | 1975–76†
| align="left" | Nets
| 4 || - || 5.8 || .000 || .000 || .000 || 0.5 || 0.3 || 0.0 || 0.0 || 0.0
|- class="sortbottom"
| style="text-align:center;" colspan="2"| Career
| 16 || - || 16.1 || .411 || .000 || .700 || 2.8 || 0.6 || 0.2 || 0.1 || 3.3
|}

References

1950 births
Living people
American men's basketball players
Basketball players at the 1971 Pan American Games
Basketball players from Long Beach, California
Long Beach City Vikings men's basketball players
Long Beach State Beach men's basketball players
Milwaukee Bucks draft picks
Milwaukee Bucks players
New York Nets players
Pan American Games competitors for the United States
San Antonio Spurs players
Small forwards